Pennant International Group Plc comprises a number of individual companies which provide engineering products and services to wide range of markets in the UK, Canada, Australasia and the US. Its head office is in Cheltenham, UK.

The Company operates through three segments:
Training Systems, both hardware and software based, in the defence sector,
Data Services, to the defence, rail, power and government sectors,
Software, including the Omega suite of software sold into the Canadian and Australian defence sectors.

GenFly

Origins
The GenFly Generic Flying Controls Trainer is an aircraft maintenance training rig developed in the late twentieth century for the Royal Air Force, for use in training airframe mechanics and technicians, particularly in maintenance activities involving flying controls and aircraft hydraulics.

Service

The RAF took delivery of four GenFly units to RAF Cosford, UK. The training manuals were written to RAF aircraft maintenance documentation standards, in order to familiarise students with the format. All four rigs were assigned tail numbers from the RAF military aircraft register, to allow even greater realism in simulating aircraft documentation, while avoiding the possibility of confusion from fabricated tail numbers coinciding with those of real airframes. The tail numbers are: ZJ695, ZJ696, ZJ697 and ZJ698. The device entered service in 2001.

References

External links
Pennant International web site

Royal Air Force education and training
Aircraft simulators
Engineering software companies
Flight training
Military education and training
Training companies